2BE was Sydney's and Australia's first officially recognised commercial radio station, commencing broadcasting on 7 November 1924. It broadcast on the medium wave band at 870 kHz, with a power of 100 watts.

Background
The station was owned and operated by the Burgin Electric Company, owned by Rowley Burgin, and 2BE was managed by Oswald Francis (Ossie) Mingay.

2BE held a Radio Dance Night on 23 December 1925, in aid of cancer research. On 3 March 1927 the station broadcast from the Radio and Electrical Exhibition at the Sydney Town Hall.

In 1927, 2BE was off the air for a few months on account of a fire.

The station only broadcast on two days per week, for at least the first two years.  It closed exactly five years after opening, on 6 November 1929.

After Closure
On 30 November 1937, the 2BE call-sign was re-allocated to 2BE Bega, New South Wales, which now broadcasts as 2EC.

2BE's 870 kHz wavelength was allocated to another Sydney station, 2GB.

See also
 History of broadcasting
 History of broadcasting in Australia
 Oldest radio station
 Timeline of Australian radio
 List of Australian AM radio stations

References

History of broadcasting
History of radio
History of telecommunications in Australia
Defunct radio stations in Australia
Radio stations established in 1924
Radio stations disestablished in 1929